Muhammad Hafiz bin Hashim  (born 13 September 1982) is a former Malaysian badminton player whose biggest success was winning the 2003 All England Open Badminton Championships. He is currently the Malaysian national coach for junior under-15 singles.

Personal life
He studied at Sekolah Kebangsaan Sultan Ismail before transferring to Kuala Lumpur. Hafiz had also studied at  Sekolah Menengah Kebangsaan Pintu Geng and Sultan Ismail College.

Hafiz achieved worldwide fame by winning the All England Open Badminton Championships in 2003. He is one of the most successful Malay badminton players aside from the Sidek brothers. Hafiz was among those coached by Misbun Sidek, the eldest of the Sidek brothers and a former national singles coach.

On court, Hafiz was known for his calmness regardless of who his opponent was. He is the younger brother of Roslin Hashim, a former world No.1.

Achievements

Southeast Asian Games 
Men's singles

Commonwealth Games 
Men's singles

BWF Grand Prix 
The BWF Grand Prix has two levels, the BWF Grand Prix and Grand Prix Gold. It is a series of badminton tournaments sanctioned by the Badminton World Federation (BWF) since 2007. The World Badminton Grand Prix sanctioned by International Badminton Federation (IBF) from 1983 to 2006.

Men's singles

  BWF Grand Prix Gold tournament
  BWF & IBF Grand Prix tournament

Honour
  :
 Member of the Order of the Defender of the Realm (A.M.N.) (2005)

References

External links
 Profile at Badminton Association of Malaysia

1982 births
Living people
People from Kota Bharu
Malaysian people of Malay descent
Malaysian male badminton players
Badminton players at the 2002 Commonwealth Games
Badminton players at the 2010 Commonwealth Games
Commonwealth Games gold medallists for Malaysia
Commonwealth Games medallists in badminton
Badminton players at the 2002 Asian Games
Badminton players at the 2006 Asian Games
Badminton players at the 2010 Asian Games
Asian Games bronze medalists for Malaysia
Asian Games medalists in badminton
Medalists at the 2002 Asian Games
Medalists at the 2006 Asian Games
Competitors at the 2005 Southeast Asian Games
Competitors at the 2009 Southeast Asian Games
Southeast Asian Games gold medalists for Malaysia
Southeast Asian Games silver medalists for Malaysia
Southeast Asian Games bronze medalists for Malaysia
Southeast Asian Games medalists in badminton
Members of the Order of the Defender of the Realm
Malaysian Muslims
Medallists at the 2002 Commonwealth Games
Medallists at the 2010 Commonwealth Games